Sundatty is one of the subdivisions of Yedakadu in south India.

References

Villages in Nilgiris district